The 2023 Snooker Shoot Out (officially the 2023 BetVictor Snooker Shoot Out) was a professional snooker tournament that took place from 25 to 28 January 2023 at the Morningside Arena in Leicester, England. Played under a variation of the standard rules of snooker, with every match contested over a single , the tournament was the ninth ranking event of the 2022–23 snooker season and the sixth of eight events in the 2023 European Series. Sponsored by BetVictor, the event was broadcast by Eurosport in Europe and by multiple other broadcasters internationally. The winner received £50,000 from a total prize fund of £171,000.  

Hossein Vafaei was the defending champion, having defeated Mark Williams 71–0 in the 2022 final. However, Vafaei lost 9–33 to Shaun Murphy in the first round. Aged 14 years and three months, Vladislav Gradinari became the youngest player to win a televised match at a ranking event when he defeated Ng On-yee in the first round. Reanne Evans became the first woman to win a match in a Snooker Shoot Out event, as well as the first woman to win a televised match at any ranking event, when she defeated Stuart Bingham in the first round.

In the final of the event, Chris Wakelin faced Belgian teenager Julien Leclercq, who had turned professional at the beginning of the season. Both players contested their first ranking final. Wakelin won the event with a 119 break, the highest of the four century breaks made in the tournament, to capture the first ranking title of his ten-year professional career.

Tournament format

Prize fund
The total prize fund for the event is £171,000 with the winner receiving £50,000. The breakdown of prize money is shown below:

 Winner: £50,000
 Runner-up: £20,000
 Semi-final: £8,000
 Quarter-final: £4,000
 Last 16: £2,000
 Last 32: £1,000
 Last 64: £500
 Last 128: £250 (prize money at this stage will not count towards prize money rankings)
 Highest break: £5,000
 Total: £171,000

Tournament draw

Top half

Section 1

Section 2

Section 3

Section 4

Bottom half

Section 5

Section 6

Section 7

Section 8

Finals

Final

Notes

Century breaks 
A total of four century breaks were made during the tournament.

 119  Chris Wakelin
 117  Ali Carter
 116  Michael Holt
 106  Xiao Guodong

References

2023
2023 in snooker
2023 in English sport
2023
January 2023 sports events in the United Kingdom